Montagu Love (15 March 1877 – 17 May 1943) was an English screen, stage and vaudeville actor.

Early years 

Born in Portsmouth, Hampshire, Love was the son of Harry Love and Fanny Louisa Love, née Poad; his father was listed as accountant on the 1881 English Census.

Career 
Educated in Great Britain, Love began his career as an artist, with his first important job as an illustrator for The Illustrated Daily News in London.

Love's acting debut came with an American company in a production in the Isle of Wight.  His Broadway debut occurred in The Second in Command (1913).

He was typically cast in heartless villain roles. In the 1920s, he played with Rudolph Valentino in The Son of the Sheik, opposite John Barrymore in Don Juan, and appeared with Lillian Gish in 1928's The Wind. He also portrayed 'Colonel Ibbetson' in Forever (1921), the silent film version of Peter Ibbetson. Love was one of the more successful villains in silent films.

One of Love's first sound films was the part-talkie The Mysterious Island co-starring Lionel Barrymore. In 1937, he played Henry VIII in the first talking film version of Mark Twain's The Prince and the Pauper, with Errol Flynn. Love played the bigoted Bishop of the Black Canons in The Adventures of Robin Hood, also starring Flynn. However, he also played gruff authoritarian figures, such as Monsieur Cavaignac, who, contrary to history, demands the resignation of those responsible for the Dreyfus cover-up, in The Life of Emile Zola (1937), as well as Don Alejandro de la Vega, whose son appears to be a fop but is actually Zorro, in the 1940 version of The Mark of Zorro, starring Tyrone Power.

In 1941, he played a doctor in Shining Victory. In 1939's Gunga Din,  Montagu Love reads the final stanza of Rudyard Kipling's original poem over the body of the slain Din.

Love's last film to be released, Devotion, was released three years after his death aged 66 in 1943. He was interred at Chapel of the Pines Crematory. His last acting performance was in Wings Over the Pacific (1943).

Personal life 
Love was married to actress Marjorie Hollis.

Death 
On 17 May 1943, Love died in Beverly Hills, California at age 66.

Filmography 

The Suicide Club (1914) as Prince Florizel (film debut)
Hearts in Exile (1915) as Count Nicolai
The Face in the Moonlight (1915) as Ambrose
Sunday (1915) as Henry Brinthorpe
A Royal Family (1915) as Crown Prince of Kurland
The Greater Will (1915) as Stuart Watson
The Devil's Toy (1916) as Wilfred Barsley
A Woman's Way (1916) as Oliver Whitney
Husband and Wife (1916) as Patrick Alliston
Friday the 13th (1916) as Count Varneloff
The Gilded Cage (1916) as Baron Stefano
The Hidden Scar (1916) as Henry Dalton
The Scarlet Oath (1916) as Nicholas Savaroff
Bought and Paid For (1916) as Robert Stafford
The Men She Married (1916) as Jerry Trainer
The Challenge (1916) as Quarrier
The Dancer's Peril (1917) as Michael Pavloff
Forget Me Not (1917) as Gabriel Barrat/Benedetto Barrato
Yankee Pluck (1917) as Baron Wootchi
The Brand of Satan (1917) as Jacques Cordet
The Guardian (1917) as James Rokeby
Rasputin, The Black Monk (1917) as Gregory Novik/Rasputin
The Dormant Power (1917) as Maurice Maxwell
The Awakening (1917) as Jacques Revilly
The Volunteer (1917) as Himself
Broken Ties (1918) as John Fleming
The Cross Bearer (1918) as Cardinal Mercier
Vengeance (1918) as Lorin Cuddlestone/John Cuddlestone
Stolen Orders''' (1918) as John Le PageThe Cabaret (1918) as Jaffrey DarrelTo Him That Hath (1918) as David AldrichThe Grouch (1918) as Donald GrahamThe Hand Invisible (1919) as Rodney GrahamThe Quickening Flame (1919) as John Steele
 Three Green Eyes (1919) as Allen GranatThrough the Toils (1919) as Noel Graham/Lewis MoffatA Broadway Saint (1919) as Dick VernonThe Steel King (1919) as John BlakeMan's Plaything (1920) as Pelton Vab Teel
 The Rough Neck (1919) as John MastersThe World and His Wife (1920) as Don JulianThe Riddle: Woman (1920) as Larz OlrikThe Wrong Woman (1920) as William Marshall
 The Place of Honeymoons (1920) as Edward CourtlandtShams of Society (1921) as Herbert PorterThe Case of Becky (1921) as Prof. BalzamoForever (1921) as Colonel IbbetsonLove's Redemption (1921) as Frederick KentThe Beauty Shop (1922) as MaldonadoWhat's Wrong with the Women? (1922) as Arthur BeldenThe Secrets of Paris (1922) as The SchoolmasterThe Darling of the Rich  (1922) as Peyton MartinThe Leopardess (1923) as Scott QuaiggLittle Old New York (1923) as Minor RoleThe Eternal City (1923) as Charles MinghelliRestless Wives (1924) as Hugo CadyRoulette (1924) as Dan CarringtonWeek End Husbands (1924) as Thomas MowryA Son of the Sahara (1924) as Sultan Cassim Ammeh/Colonel BarbierLove of Women (1924) as Bronson Gibbs
 Who's Cheating? (1924) as Harrison FieldsSinners in Heaven (1924) as Native ChiefThe Ancient Highway (1925) as Ivan HurdThe Desert's Price (1925) as Jim MartinThe Mad Marriage (1925) as Unknown roleHands Up! (1926) as Capt. Edward LoganBrooding Eyes (1926) as Pat CallaghanOut of the Storm (1926) as Timothy KeithThe Social Highwayman (1926) as Ducket NelsonSon of the Sheik (1926) as GhabahDon Juan (1926) as Count Giano DonatiThe Silent Lover (1926) as Ben AchmedOne Hour of Love (1927) as J.W. McKayThe Night of Love (1927) as Duke de la GardaThe King of Kings (1927) as Roman CenturionThe Tender Hour (1927) as Gramd Duke SergeiRose of the Golden West (1927) as Gen. ValleroJesse James (1927) as Frederick MimmsGood Time Charley (1927) as John HartwellThe Haunted Ship (1927) as Captain Simon GantThe Noose (1928) as Buck GordonThe Devil's Skipper (1928) as First MateThe Hawk's Nest (1928) as Dan DaughertyThe Wind (1928) as Wirt RoddyThe Haunted House (1928) as Mad DoctorSynthetic Sin (1929) as Brandy MulaneThe Last Warning (1929) as Arthur McHughThe Divine Lady (1929) as Captain HardyBulldog Drummond (1929) as PetersonMidstream (1929) as Dr. NelsonCharming Sinners (1929) as George WhitleyHer Private Life (1929) as Sir Bruce HadenSilks and Saddles (1929) as Walter SinclairA Most Immoral Lady (1929) as John WilliamsThe Mysterious Island (1929) as Baron FalonLove Comes Along (1930) as SangredoDouble Cross Roads (1930) as Gene DykeA Notorious Affair (1930) as Sir Thomas HanleyBack Pay (1930) as Charles WheelerInside the Lines (1930) as Governor of GibraltarOutward Bound (1930) as Mr. LingleyReno (1930) as Alexander W. BrettKismet (1930) as The JailerThe Cat Creeps (1930) as HendricksThe Lion and the Lamb (1931) as Professor TottieAlexander Hamilton (1931) as Thomas JeffersonLove Bound (1932) as John RandolphStowaway (1932) as GroderVanity Fair (1932) as Marquis of SteyneThe Silver Lining (1932) as Michael MooreThe Riding Tornado (1932) as Walt CorsonThe Midnight Lady (1932) as Harvey AustinOut of Singapore (1932) as Scar Murray – BoatswainThe Mystic Hour (1933) as Captain James alias The FoxHis Double Life (1933) as Duncan FarrelMenace (1934) as Police InspectorLimehouse Blues (1934) as Pug TalbotClive of India (1935) as Gov. PigotThe Crusades (1935) as The BlacksmithHi, Gaucho! (1935) as Hillario BolarioThe Man Who Broke the Bank at Monte Carlo (1935) as DirectorSutter's Gold (1936) as Capt. KettlesonThe Country Doctor (1936) as Sir Basil CrawfordFrankie and Johnny (1936) as Colonel Brand (uncredited)Champagne Charlie (1936) as Ivan SuchineThe White Angel (1936) as Mr. Bullock, Under Secretary of WarSing, Baby, Sing (1936) as Robert WilsonReunion (1936) as Sir Basil CrawfordLloyd's of London (1936) as HawkinsOne in a Million (1936) as Ratoffsky – alias of Sir Frederick Brooks, Olympic SecretaryThe Prince and the Pauper (1937) as Henry VIIIParnell (1937) as GladstoneLondon by Night (1937) as Sir Arthur HerrickThe Life of Emile Zola (1937) as M. CavaignacThe Prisoner of Zenda (1937) as DetchardA Damsel in Distress (1937) as Lord MarshmortonAdventure's End (1937) as Capt. Abner DrewTovarich (1937) as M. CourtoisThe Buccaneer (1938) as Admiral CockburnThe Adventures of Robin Hood (1938) as Bishop of the Black CanonsKidnapped (1938) as Colonel WhiteheadThe Fighting Devil Dogs (1938, Serial) as General WhiteProfessor Beware (1938) as Professor Schmutz (uncredited)If I Were King (1938) as General DudonGunga Din (1939) as Colonel WeedJuarez (1939) as Jose de MontaresSons of Liberty (1939, Short) as George WashingtonThe Man in the Iron Mask (1939) as Spanish AmbassadorRulers of the Sea (1939) as Malcolm GrantWe Are Not Alone (1939) as Major MillmanThe Lone Wolf Strikes (1940) as Emil GorlickDr. Ehrlich's Magic Bullet (1940) as Prof. HartmannNorthwest Passage (1940) as Wiseman ClagettThe Sea Hawk (1940) as King Philip IIAll This, and Heaven Too (1940) as Marechal SebastianiPrivate Affairs (1940) as Noble BullertonA Dispatch from Reuter's (1940) as John DelaneNorth West Mounted Police (1940) as Inspector CabotThe Mark of Zorro (1940) as Don Alejandro VegaThe Son of Monte Cristo (1940) as Prime Minister Baron Von NeuhoffHudson's Bay (1941) as Governor D'ArgensonThe Devil and Miss Jones (1941) as HarrisonShining Victory (1941) as Dr. BlakeLady for a Night (1942) as JudgeThe Remarkable Andrew (1942) as General George WashingtonThe Voice of Terror (1942) as General Jerome LawfordTennessee Johnson (1942) as Chief Justice ChaseForever and a Day (1943) as Sir John BunnThe Constant Nymph (1943) as Albert Sanger (released posthumously)Wings Over the Pacific (1943) as Jim Butler (released posthumously)Holy Matrimony (1943) as Judge (uncredited; released posthumously)Devotion'' (1946) as Rev. Brontë (final role; released posthumously)

References

External links 

 
 Silent Ladies & Gents

Montagu Love at Virtual History

English male film actors
English male silent film actors
English male stage actors
1877 births
1943 deaths
Vaudeville performers
Burials at Chapel of the Pines Crematory
British expatriate male actors in the United States
Male actors from Portsmouth
20th-century English male actors